Orelia is a southern suburb of Perth, Western Australia, located within the City of Kwinana.

Orelia is one of the Kwinana suburbs named after a ship. Orelia arrived at Fremantle bringing settlers to the new Swan River Colony in October 1829. Development of the area commenced in 1952.

Orelia Avenue is the main residential street that runs through the suburb. There is a distinct difference between the established houses on the west side and the newly built homes on the east side. However, despite this juxtaposition, there is a cross mix between the style and design of housing in the suburb which adds to its originality and character.

See also

Gilmore College
Murder of Aaron Pajich

References

External links

Suburbs of Perth, Western Australia
Suburbs in the City of Kwinana